Edward Smith (22 February 1902 – 1972) was an English footballer who played in the Football League for Bristol Rovers, Hartlepools United, Luton Town, Newport County, Portsmouth and Reading.

References

1902 births
1972 deaths
English footballers
Association football defenders
English Football League players
Hartlepool United F.C. players
Newport County A.F.C. players
Portsmouth F.C. players
Reading F.C. players
Luton Town F.C. players
Preston North End F.C. players
Bristol Rovers F.C. players